Hicks-Beach or Hicks Beach is a surname, and may refer to:

 Hicks baronets
 Various of the Hicks and Hicks Beach Baronets, of Beverston, and the family of the Earl St Aldwyn
Sir Michael Hicks Beach, 8th Baronet (1809–1854), Conservative Member of Parliament for East Gloucestershire
Michael Hicks Beach, 1st Earl St Aldwyn (1837–1916), Conservative Member of Parliament, Chancellor of the Exchequer
Michael Hicks Beach, 2nd Earl St Aldwyn (1912–1992), Conservative politician
 William Frederick Hicks-Beach (1841–1923), Conservative Member of Parliament for Tewkesbury 1916–1918
 Michael Hugh Hicks-Beach, Viscount Quenington (1877–1916), Conservative Member of Parliament for Tewkesbury 1906–1916
 William W. Hicks Beach (1907–1975), Conservative Party Member of Parliament for Cheltenham 1950–1964

Compound surnames